Forbidden Broadway: Rude Awakening is the 2007 incarnation of Gerard Alessandrini's long-running hit Off-Broadway musical revue Forbidden Broadway, which parodies notable current Broadway and Off-Broadway musicals.

Rude Awakening opened on October 2, 2007 at New York's 47th Street Theatre and closed on March 24, 2008. The show was conceived, created and written by Alessandrini and was directed by Alessandrini and Phillip George.

The musicals parodied in Rude Awakening include Wicked, A Chorus Line, Les Misérables, The Little Mermaid, Grey Gardens, Chicago, Spring Awakening, Jersey Boys, Spamalot and Mary Poppins.

Opening night cast 
Jared Bradshaw
Janet Dickinson
James Donegan
Valerie Fagan
Steve Saari, piano

Replacements and understudies 
Michael West, replaced James Donegan
Megan Lewis, replaced Janet Dickinson
William Selby, dance captain/male understudy
Gina Kreizemar, female understudy

Album 
The tracks featured on the cast recording are:
 It's D'sgusting (It's D'Lovely)
 Forbidden Broadway: Rude Awakening
 Medley: Marry Poppins: Chim Chim Cher-ee/Supercalifragilisticexpialadocious
 Curtains For Curtains (Show People)
 Medley: Company: Company/Being Alive
 Grey Gardens (The Revolutionary Costume For Today)
 Medley: Jersey Goys: Sherry/Walk Like a Man/Big Girls Don't Cry
 The Be-Littled Mermaid (Part Of Your World)
 Medley: Spamalot: Camelot/The Song That Goes Like This
 Medley: Even More Miserables: C'est Magnifique/Master Of the House/On My Own
 Medley: A Chorus Line: God, I Hope I Get It/One
 You Can't Stop the Camp (You Can't Stop the Beat)
 Medley: Wicked & the Flying Monkeys: Defying Gravity/Don't Monkey With Broadway
 Medley: Spring Awakening: Mack the Knife/Mama Who Bore Me/Totally F***ed
 Finale (What I Did For Love)
 Medley: Yoko Ono On Broadway: Oh, What a Beautiful Mornin'/Oklahoma!/Imagine
 Medley: Sour Charity: Hey Big Spender/If They Could See Me Now/There's Gotta Be Something Better Than This/I'm a Brass Band
 Chicago-Give 'Em the Old Star Replacement (Razzle Dazzle)
 Medley: Light In the Piazza: Statues & Stories/Say It Somehow/Tonight
 The Impossible Song (The Impossible Dream)
 Medley: Doubt: Who's Afraid Of the Big Bad Wolf/Shout

See also 
 Forbidden Broadway
 Forbidden Broadway, Vol. 1
 Forbidden Broadway, Vol. 2
 Forbidden Broadway, Vol. 3
 Forbidden Hollywood
 Forbidden Broadway Strikes Back
 Forbidden Broadway Cleans Up Its Act
 Forbidden Broadway: 20th Anniversary Edition
 Forbidden Broadway 2001: A Spoof Odyssey
 Forbidden Broadway: Special Victims Unit
 Forbidden Broadway Goes to Rehab

References

External links
ForbiddenBroadway.com

2007 musicals
Off-Broadway musicals
Revues
Drama Desk Award winners